Peoria Academy is an independent, secular elementary and middle school located in the northwestern end of Peoria, Illinois. The school was founded in 2000, and is governed by a board of trustees. The academy is accredited through ISACS (Independent Schools Association of the Central States).

History
In February 2000, a core group of parents, community members, and administrators founded Peoria Academy as an independent, private, non-profit school, serving students in Kindergarten through 8th grade.  A 3 million dollar capital campaign was established to purchase the Knights of Columbus building on Willow Knolls Drive and renovations began immediately. Peoria Academy opened its doors in August 2000 with 137 students. In 2001, a Pre-K program was added, and additional classes were added at each grade level. Due to the growth of the school and insufficient space, the Board of Trustees began leasing the Notre Dame Youth Center, which is adjacent to the Peoria Academy property.

In 2010, founding Headmaster Karen Calder retired after ten years of service. In 2010, the school also began building additional classrooms to accommodate the growing student population. The results were two brand new, steel-reinforced classrooms that also serve as state-rated tornado shelters.

In 2011, a Pre-K3 program was added.

Technology
The school has implemented a one-to-one computer program in the Middle School. Smartboards or projectors are used in nearly every classroom throughout the school. During the 2013–2014 school year, a STEM course was added to the Middle School core curriculum.

Fine Arts
Every student, Pre-K3 - 8th grade, participates in Art. The Art program is extensive and includes drawing, making prints, ceramics, painting and more.

The Pre-K3 - Pre-K program is focused on developing and refining fine motor skills by working with many different mediums. Each week a different artist is studied by reading books and looking at pictures of their work which then is used in the weekly lesson recreating their own art pieces inspired by the weekly author.

Students, grades 2–8, present a theatrical production every year, ranging from popular Broadway musicals to dramas. The students are involved in every aspect of the productions, both on stage and behind the scenes.

In addition to regular course offerings in art and music, Peoria Academy offers additional classes through their After-school Enrichment Program (AEP), which is open to Peoria Academy students and the public. Courses include various instrument lessons ranging from piano all the way to ukulele, a variety of dance styles, specialized art classes, creative writing, games and more.

Foreign Language
Peoria Academy begins foreign language instruction at the Pre-K3 level, with instruction twice a week in Spanish, and it continues in all grade levels through the 4th grade. In the 5th-8th grade, Spanish language instruction is provided as one of the six core classes.

Every year, students in 8th grade may opt to take a summer trip to a Spanish-speaking country.

Athletics
Physical education and athletic programs are a part of the school's philosophy for developing the whole child. In competitive sports and cheerleading, Peoria Academy has a no-cut policy to encourage maximum participation by all interested students.

Peoria Academy's athletics provide opportunities for students to participate in various sports at developmentally appropriate levels. Students are expected to demonstrate cooperative play, commitment to their team and adherence to rules and guidelines as established by each coach. The goal is to develop young people athletically, academically, and to better prepare them for the challenges that lie ahead.

Peoria Academy teams compete locally with both public and parochial schools.  They also participate in IESA in basketball, volleyball, and cross country.

Peoria Academy sports include: Girls' Basketball, Boys' Basketball, Cheerleading, Volleyball, Track and Cross Country.

References

External links
Peoria Academy — official site

Educational institutions established in 2000
Private elementary schools in Illinois
Private middle schools in Illinois
Preparatory schools in Illinois
Schools in Peoria County, Illinois
2000 establishments in Illinois
Education in Peoria, Illinois